National Agricultural Libraries include:

 United States National Agricultural Library
 Central Scientific Agricultural Library of Russia
 Egyptian National Agricultural Library 
 Hungarian National Agricultural Library